is a Japanese retired footballer.

Club career statistics
Updated to 23 February 2017.

References

External links
Profile at Tochigi SC

1984 births
Living people
Hannan University alumni
Association football people from Kyoto Prefecture
Japanese footballers
J2 League players
J3 League players
Sagan Tosu players
Tochigi SC players
Association football forwards